('Historical Journal for Finland') is a Swedish-language Finnish history journal which has been published by the  ('Historical society') since 1916. He served as the journal's editor until 1924. With support for translation from the Delegation for the Promotion of Swedish Literature, managed by the Society of Swedish Literature in Finland, the journal is now also a forum for Finnish-speaking historians. The journal is published four times a year and has approximately 550 subscribers, primarily from Finland, the Nordic countries, and the Baltic region. Each paper is reviewed by two external referees.

 is available on the Federation of Finnish Learned Societies' website as an Open Access publication as of the 1990 issues. New editions are published on HTF DIGITALT with a one-year delay.

Editors-in-chief 

 1916–1924 
 1925–1969 
 1970–1981 Jarl Gallén
 1982–2000 Max Engman
 2001–2016 Lars-Folke Landgrén
 2017– Jennica Thylin-Klaus

References

External links 

  

History of Finland
Swedish-language journals
Quarterly journals
Delayed open access journals
European history journals